Lawrence Jeffrey Epstein (born 1946) is an American author who writes and lectures about American culture and society, Jewish life, and mystery fiction. He is best known for his book The Haunted Smile: The Story of Jewish Comedians in America and his Danny Ryle Mysteries series. He writes intermittently about Bob Dylan and popular culture for The Best American Poetry blog.

Biography 
Epstein was born in New York City and raised there and in Sag Harbor, New York. His father was a merchant and Veterans’ Counselor. His mother was a photographer and housewife. He got a B.A., M.A. and Ph.D. from the University at Albany. From 1974 until 2008 he was a professor of English at Suffolk County Community College, where he also held jobs as Assistant Head of the Department of English and Chairperson of the Humanities Division.

In an interview, Epstein described his intentions for The Haunted Smile: “I wanted to tell the story of Jewish comedians in America starting at the turn of the 20th century…Then I traced the history of the comedians through vaudeville, radio, movies, and tv…I was interested, for example, in how one generation of comedians influenced another. I got to go to a Friars Roast and go backstage at a comedy club. I also interviewed more than 70 people…I wanted to include the struggles Jewish comedians had, and the weight of their past.” 

Filmmaker Michael J. Epstein is his son.

In 2018, he started publishing The Danny Ryle Mysteries, including the titles: At the end of 2018 he began to publish his most successful mystery series. The books in the series include: The Dead Don’t Talk, A Darker Shade of Blood, The Starry Night of Death, and The Hunted Girl.

Bibliography

References

External links
Official Website

1946 births
Living people
American biographers
American male biographers
Writers from New York City
People from Sag Harbor, New York
University at Albany, SUNY alumni
Suffolk County Community College faculty